George Ainslie (October 30, 1838 – May 19, 1913) was a lawyer, mining investor, and Congressional delegate from Idaho Territory.

Early life and career
George Ainslie was born in Boonville, Cooper County, Missouri. George's grandfather and father had served in the Scottish regiments of the British Army. Also, his uncle, Colonel William Ainslie, served with the 93rd Regiment of Foot (the "Sutherland Highlanders"). The exploits of "The Sutherlands" during the Crimean War gave rise to the phrase, "The Thin Red Line", later applied to British Army infantry in general.

George's parents, John and Mary, moved to Missouri around two years before he was born. His father became a wealthy landowner, and also operated a salt works. The family went back to Scotland for a time while George was an infant, but returned in 1844. His father drowned in the Missouri River in June of that year.

In his late teens, Ainslie read law under experienced lawyers and a judge in St. Louis. He also attended courses at what is now St. Louis University. George attained a law degree and was admitted to the Missouri bar in 1860. After a few months practicing law in Missouri, he moved to the Pike's Peak area in Colorado Territory. He opened a law office there and apparently invested in some mining properties.

Relocation to Idaho
Two years later, gold discoveries in Idaho attracted Ainslie's attention. He moved to Elk City, Idaho, during the summer of 1862 and mined in that area until the winter season closed the back country. Probably at the advice of people familiar with the region, he then started for Oregon.

In Lewiston, Idaho he was approached with a request for his professional services. Here, accounts vary on the timeline of events. George's biography in the Illustrated History of the State of Idaho states that three men approached him to defend them in a "citizens' court" against a robbery charge. More likely, however, a representative of the men approached him, because the accused robbers were then in jail. In fact, from the timing, it is possible that the trial may have already taken place, with a guilty verdict. This particular robbery had followed a series of robberies and robbery-murders in the region, and public indignation had led to a swift decision.

So George's services were needed, whether for a trial, or for an immediate appeal. But when Ainslie went to consult with his new clients the next morning, he found them dead, hanging from the rafters of a shed behind the temporary jail. One account says that George realized "the importance of demurrer and the irrelevancy of an appeal" and "retired in good order." 
After spending the winter teaching in Clackamas County, Oregon, Ainslie moved to Idaho City, the county seat of Boise County, Idaho. He would practice law there, and invest in mining properties, for over a quarter century. George also married and began raising a family. His 1866 marriage to Sara "Sallie" Owens took place in Ada County. The Ainslies were strong Episcopalians, so it is possible the regional pastor was not scheduled to be in Idaho City at a convenient time. From 1869 to 1873, Ainslie edited the Idaho World newspaper in Idaho City.

Political career
In 1865, two years after his move to Idaho City, voters elected Ainslie to the Territorial Council (roughly equivalent to a state senate). Despite his youth, members then elected him as Council President. (Although his biography for the U. S. Congress says he was a member of the "Territorial Legislature," Idaho records confirm his Council position.) After his term in the Council, George returned to private law practice, but remained very active in Democratic Party activities. (In keeping with the times, the Idaho World was then billed as "the only Democratic newspaper in the Territory.")

In 1874, he began a two-year term as District Attorney for the Second District of Idaho Territory. Then, in 1878, he was elected as Idaho Territorial Delegate to the U. S. Congress. (Delegates can vote in committee, but not on the legislative floor.) The Republican editor  of the Idaho Tri-Weekly Statesman, in Boise City, opined that  "though differing with Mr. Ainslie in politics, we freely accord to him the merit which he deserves."

Ainslie served two terms as Delegate before losing a re-election bid in 1882. He never again ran for public office, but remained a power in state-level Democratic Party politics for many years. In 1889, he represented Boise County in the Idaho constitutional convention.

Later life and career
After its heyday, Idaho City steadily declined in population. Thus, Ainslie moved his family to Boise in 1890, after purchasing an estate across the street from the U. S. Assay Office. He then invested heavily in various enterprises in Boise. That included the Boise Artesian Hot & Cold Water Company and the Boise Rapid Transit Company.

George never lost his interest in mining. For nine years after about 1888, he owned stock in a company that had extensive placer mining claims stretching along Mores Creek from two miles above Idaho City to about four miles below the town. In the early 1890s, those claims became involved in protracted litigation. However, Ainslie and his co-owners eventually won their cases and, in 1897, sold out to a firm that built the first large gold dredge along Mores Creek.

The Ainslie's two daughters, Lucy and Adelma, continued the family tradition of service. Lucy married a prominent San Francisco physician. Adelma married John F. Nugent, later a U. S. Senator from Idaho. A grandson, George Ainslie Nugent, served in the armed forces during World War I. Around 1906, poor health led Ainslie to seek more extensive medical treatment in California. By about 1908, he had moved to Oakland, California. He died there five years later.

References

Other sources

1838 births
1913 deaths
American people of Scottish descent
People from Boonville, Missouri
Members of the Idaho Territorial Legislature
Delegates to the United States House of Representatives from Idaho Territory
Idaho Democrats
19th-century American politicians
People from Idaho City, Idaho
American lawyers admitted to the practice of law by reading law